Over the years The Beano has had many different strips, ranging from comic strips to adventure strips to prose stories. Prose stories were the first to go, being phased out in 1955. Adventure strips were phased out in 1975, with the last one being General Jumbo (There have been unsuccessful attempts to reintroduce adventure strips with new series of Billy the Cat and Katie in 2003, 2005 and 2009.) The longest-running strip in The Beano is Dennis the Menace, which has been running for seventy years. Other long-running strips include Biffo the Bear, Minnie the Minx, Roger the Dodger, The Bash Street Kids, Little Plum, and Billy Whizz. As of 2015, The Beano has been home to 371 different strips (with a further seventeen strips appearing in Comic Idol competitions and not later appearing in the comic).

This list only features strips in the weekly comic and does not list strips that only appeared once. It also includes information about the Comic Idol winners, from 1995 to 2010.

List of humorous Beano comic strips
Source:

List of Funsize Funnies
In 2012 the Beano began printing a new section called the Funsize Funnies. This section featured short three to four panel comic strips. It originally featured old and existing Beano characters in these stories but as time went on the section began to feature celebrity parodies and wholly original characters.

List of Beano adventure strips
Ever since the first issue of The Beano until 1975 there have been adventure strips in the comic. However they continued in the Annuals and attempts were made to revive them in the comic in the 2000s with three new series of Billy the Cat and the release of The Beano Action Special. Some of these strips started off being adapted from earlier prose stories. The longest running Adventure strips are Tom Thumb (1938–1958), Jack Flash (1949–1958), Jimmy and his Magic Patch (1944–1959), The Iron Fish (1949–1967), Red Rory of the Eagles (1951–1962), General Jumbo (1953–1975) and Billy the Cat (1967–1974, 2003–2009). Of these seven long running adventure strips Tom Thumb, The Iron Fish and Red Rory began as Prose stories. During their run in the comic there were 85 different adventure strips.

List of prose stories
From the Beano's first issue up until 1955 the Beano contained prose stories. These were similar to other text stories found in older story papers and featured a prose story usually of one or two pages (they could be longer in the annuals) and often featured an illustration at the top of the page with the title of the prose story. A number of these prose stories went on to become adventure strips and some adventure strips even had prose story versions. During their lifetime in The Beano there were 79 different prose stories of which 15 also appeared as Adventure strips. These strips were Jack of Clubs, Tom Thumb, Little Noah's Ark, The Iron Fish, Red Rory of the Eagles, Sinbad the Sailor, Little Master of the Mighty Chang, The Bird Boy, The Wily Ways of Simple Simon, The Invisible Giant, The Hungry Goodwins, Tick Tock Timothy, Smarty Smokey, Prince on the Flying Horse and Follow the Secret Hand. The issue following the 75th Anniversary Special in 2013 introduced a new text story called Diary of an Ugly Kid, which disappeared later that year. In 2014 yet another appeared titled Diary of a Bash Street Kid.

List of Comic Idol runners-up
The following is a list of comic strips which appeared in The Beano during a Comic Idol or similar competition but did not win. Many of these strips appeared in annuals and Gordon Bennet went on to appear in The Beano a few years after coming runner up in a Comic Idol competition. Even though these strips did not win a Comic Idol competition many of them lasted longer than a number of other Beano comic strips such as Alf Wit which only lasted two issues. Phone-a-Fiend and Space Kidette are the only two strips on this list which appeared as one-offs.

In 2014, it was called Beanotown's Got Talent.

See also
The Beano
List of Beano comic strips by annual
The Dandy
List of Dandy comic strips
The Beezer
List of Beezer comic strips
List of Beezer and Topper comic strips

References

External links
 An outdated and incomplete list of The Beano comic strips, Paul Morris' blog
 A list of the 100 longest-running The Beano comic strips, Comics UK

Comics anthologies
The Beano
British comics
Beano